Hutton v Warren [1836] EWHC J61 is an English contract law case, concerning implied terms.

Facts
A farm tenant, who lived in Wroot, Lincolnshire, claimed that it was the custom of the country that the landlord would give a reasonable allowance for seeds and labour to keep the land arable, and that he would leave manure should the landlord wish to purchase it.

Judgment
Parke B held in favour of the farm tenant, because such an implied term was the general custom. He said the following.

See also

English contract law

Notes

References

English contract case law
1836 in British law
1836 in case law
Court of Exchequer Chamber cases